Sharbazher is a town in Sharbazher District, Sulaymaniyah Governorate, Kurdistan Region in Iraq.

References

Populated places in Sulaymaniyah Province
District capitals of Iraq
Kurdish settlements in Iraq